Drawing Home is a 2017 Canadian-American adventure romantic drama film written by Donna Logan and Markus Rupprecht, directed by Rupprecht and starring Julie Lynn Mortensen and Juan Riedinger and featuring Kate Mulgrew, Rutger Hauer, Peter Strauss and Wallace Shawn.

Cast
Julie Lynn Mortensen as Catharine Robb Whyte
Juan Riedinger as Peter Whyte
Kate Mulgrew as Edith Morse Robb
Kristin Griffith as Jean Caird
Rutger Hauer as Carl Rungius
Peter Strauss as Russell Robb Sr.
Torrance Coombs as Kit Paley
Christian Campbell as Cliff Whyte
Wallace Shawn as Mr. Garfield
Jeff Gladstone as John D. Rockefeller III
Judith Buchan as Annie Whyte
John Treleaven as Dave Whyte
Helmer Twoyoungmen as Mark Poucette

Release
The film was released on December 1, 2017.

Reception
Helen T. Verongos of The New York Times gave the film a negative review and wrote, "The pacing is uneven, and the movie feels slow in spots and too long overall, even though it lacks detail that would have enriched it."

Sheri Linden of The Hollywood Reporter also gave the film a negative review and wrote, "...director Markus Rupprecht and his co-writer, Donna Logan, never get beyond the handsome period surface to an involving emotional core."

Gary Goldstein of the Los Angeles Times also gave the film a negative review and wrote, "In the same way that not every novel should be made into a movie, not every true-life story warrants the big-screen treatment."

References

External links